Platelet-derived growth factor C, also known as PDGF-C, is a 345-amino acid protein that in humans is encoded by the PDGFC gene. Platelet-derived growth factors are important in connective tissue growth, survival and function, and consist of disulphide-linked dimers involving two polypeptide chains, PDGF-A and PDGF-B.  PDGF-C is a member of the PDGF/VEGF family of growth factors with a unique two-domain structure and expression pattern.  PDGF-C was not previously identified with PDGF-A and PDGF-B, possibly because it may be that it is synthesized and secreted as a latent growth factor, requiring proteolytic removal of the N-terminal CUB domain for receptor binding and activation.

Function 

The protein encoded by this gene is a member of the platelet-derived growth factor family. The four members of this family are mitogenic factors for cells of mesenchymal origin and are characterized by a core motif of eight cysteines. This gene product appears to form only homodimers. It differs from the platelet-derived growth factor alpha and beta polypeptides in having an unusual N-terminal domain, the CUB domain.

PDGF-C is a key component of the PDGFR-α signaling pathway and has a specific role in palatogenesis and the morphogenesis of the integumentary tissue. The phenotypes of compound mutants imply that PDGF-C and PDGF-A may function as principal ligands for PDGFR-α.

Mouse knockout studies show that PDGF-C is required for palatogenesis. Although human studies support an etiologic role for several genes in cleft lip and palate etiology (PVRL1, IRF6, and MSX1), expression levels of the mouse homologs of these genes were unaltered in Pdgfc−/− mutant embryos that develop clefts, suggesting that their activity is not related to PDGF-C signaling in palatogenesis, so PDGF-C signaling is a new pathway in palatogenesis.

Interactions
PDGFC has been shown to interact with PDGFRA.

PDGF-C is a latent growth factor with proteolytic activation, and the processing enzyme might be controlled by the other CLP-associated genes that may indirectly connect to PDGF-C signaling. Notably, a 30-cM region on human chromosome 4, where the PDGFC gene maps, shows strong linkage association with CLP26, and clinical genetic data further suggest a potential link between PDGFC gene polymorphism and cleft lip and palate.

References

Further reading

External links